The Minister of Defence is the senior minister at the Ministry of Defence in the Estonian Government. The minister is one of the most important members of the Estonian government, with responsibility for coordinating the governments policies on national defence and the military forces. The defence minister is chosen by the prime minister as a part of the government.

When the position was originally established in 1918, it was called the minister of war (Sõjaminister). The post was renamed minister of defence on April 1, 1929, but would change back to minister of war in 1937. Though the name of the position, and subsequently the ministry, was changed, the main responsibilities of the position remained virtually same.

Since Estonia regained its independence in 1991 the post has been known as the minister of defence.

List of Ministers

1918 to 1929 (Minister of War)

1929 to 1937 (Minister of Defence)

1937 to 1940 (Minister of War)

1992 to Present (Minister of Defence)

References

Sources
 https://kaitseministeerium.ee/et/ministeerium-kontaktid/kaitseminister/eesti-kaitseministrid-labi-ajaloo

External links
 Republic of Estonia Governments
 Ministry of Defence
 Estonian Defence Forces

Defence
 Defenc minister
Ministers of Defence